The 1981 NCAA Division I-AA Football Championship Game was a postseason college football game between the Eastern Kentucky Colonels and the Idaho State Bengals. The game was played on December 19, 1981, at Memorial Stadium in Wichita Falls, Texas. The culminating game of the 1981 NCAA Division I-AA football season, it was won by Idaho State, 34–23.

The game was also known as the Pioneer Bowl, a name that had been used starting in 1971 for various NCAA playoff games held in Wichita Falls. The Colonels were making their third consecutive appearance in the I-AA championship game.

Teams
The participants of the Championship Game were the finalists of the 1981 I-AA Playoffs, which began with an eight-team bracket.

Eastern Kentucky Colonels

Eastern Kentucky finished their regular season with a 10–1 record (8–0 in conference); their only loss was to Navy of Division I-A. Ranked first in the final NCAA I-AA in-house poll and seeded first in the tournament, the Colonels defeated seventh-seed Delaware and fourth-seed Boise State to reach the final. This was the third appearance for Eastern Kentucky in a Division I-AA championship game, having won in 1979 and having lost in 1980.

Idaho State Bengals

Idaho State finished their regular season with a 9–1 record (6–1 in conference); their only loss was an away game at Montana. Ranked second in the final NCAA I-AA in-house poll and seeded second in the tournament, the Bengals defeated eighth-seed Rhode Island and third-seed South Carolina State to reach the final. This was the first appearance for Idaho State in a Division I-AA championship game.

Game summary

Scoring summary

Game statistics

See also
 1981 NCAA Division I-AA football rankings

References

Further reading

External links
 Highlights from the 1981 1-AA National Championship Team—the ISU Bengals via YouTube
 EKU vs Idaho State - 1981 Part 1, Part 2, Part 3, Part 4 via YouTube

Championship Game
NCAA Division I Football Championship Games
Eastern Kentucky Colonels football games
Idaho State Bengals football games
American football competitions in Texas
Sports in Wichita Falls, Texas
NCAA Division I-AA Football Championship Game
NCAA Division I-AA Football Championship Game